Taihangshan Gorge is located in the Shanxi province of China. It is a famous scenic spot, and has been honoured as one of the top ten gorges of China. It is a part of Taihangshan Valley National Forest Park, which covers 44 beauty spots and includes cliffs, forests and temples.

References 

Landforms of Shanxi
Canyons and gorges of China
Tourist attractions in Shanxi